The Givon Art Gallery is a contemporary art gallery in Tel Aviv, Israel.

The Gallery was founded in 1974 by Sam Givon on Gordon Street in Tel Aviv.  In 1979 his daughter, Naomi (Noemi) opened the Givon Contemporary Art Gallery.  Since the founder's death in 2000, the Gallery has been managed by Naomi Givon and is co-owned with her sister, Nurit Wolf, an attorney.

The proprietor is Naomi Givon.  In 2012 Givon completed the architecturally notable renovation of an abandoned 1890 house in Tel Aviv's Neve Tzedek neighborhood.

Artists represented by Givon include Pinchas Cohen Gan, Micha Ullman,  Moshe Gershuni, Raffi Lavie

Givon Art Prize
The Shmuel Givon Prize is awarded annually in the founder's memory by the Tel Aviv Museum of Art.

Recipients
2001 Guy Ben-Ner
2002 Karen Russo
2003 Adam Rabinowitz, Shai Zurim
2004 Talia Keinan
2005 Gilad Ratman, Gil Marco Shani
2006 Bat Sheva Ross
2007 Lior Shvil
2008 Orly Sever, Nir Evron
2009 Yoav Efrati
2010 Tamar Harpaz, Yael Efrati
2011 Hila Toony Navok, Efrat Kedem
2012 Nevet Yitzhak, Ester Schneider

References

External links
Givon Art Gallery

Contemporary art galleries in Israel
Israeli art dealers
Art galleries established in 1974
1974 establishments in Israel